Jadranka is a feminine given name, the South Slavic variant of Adriana. Notable people with the name include:

Jadranka Barjaktarović (born 1981), Montenegrin singer
Jadranka Đokić (born 1981), Croatian actress
Jadranka Joksimović (born 1978), Serbian politician
Jadranka Jovanović (born 1958), Serbian opera singer
Jadranka Kosor (born 1953), Croatian politician
Jadranka Lončarek, Croatian biologist
Jadranka Pejanović (1979–2018), Serbian actress
Jadranka Skorin-Kapov (born 1955), Croatian academic
Jadranka Stojaković (1950–2016), Bosnian singer-songwriter
Jadranka Travaš-Sejdić, New Zealand academic

Jadranka Nikolic- 2006 Born:Austria 

Bosnian feminine given names
Croatian feminine given names
Montenegrin feminine given names
Serbian feminine given names
Slovene feminine given names